"Walking in My Shoes" is a song by British electronic music band Depeche Mode. It was released on 26 April 1993 as the second single from their eighth studio album, Songs of Faith and Devotion (1993). The song reached number 14 on the UK Singles Chart and matched the success of the previous single "I Feel You" on the US Billboard Modern Rock Tracks chart, where it reached one. The B-side is "My Joy", the only exclusive B-side from the Songs of Faith and Devotion album, and is a rock track in the vein of "I Feel You".
 
The 7-inch version of "Walking in My Shoes" is not the same as the one on Songs of Faith and Devotion. The sound has been made more noisy and dirty, especially the drums in the verse, and the intro has been shortened. When performed live, elements of the "Grungy Gonads" mix are used in an extended intro and throughout the song. The song was cited by then-member Alan Wilder to be his favourite song from the album together with "In Your Room". Its music video was directed by Anton Corbijn.

Release and commercial reception
"Walking in My Shoes" was released on 26 April 1993 in the United Kingdom. The single failed to enter list of the UK top 10 and the American top 40; nevertheless, the song became a top ten hit in some countries of Continental Europe, and became a recurring song during the live performances of the band since 1993. The song peaked number 14 on the UK Singles Chart and number 69 on the US Billboard Hot 100. On the Billboard Modern Rock Tracks chart, it peaked number one for a week.

U2 lead singer Bono listed the song on his "60 Songs That Saved My Life" playlist.

Critical reception
Sam Wood from Philadelphia Inquirer felt that "Walking in My Shoes" "with its moody minor-key melody and burbling bass-line reminiscent of early Simple Minds, adapts an ancient Native American proverb to create an anthemic plea for compassion." Leesa Daniels from Smash Hits gave the song three out of five, writing, "The great thing about the 'Mode is their songs always have a chorus that's easy to sing along to. That's the case here, although for a change it does take a few listens to get the hang of it. The song is very atmospheric in a black-and-white-grainy-film for the video kind of way. Lovely."

Music video
The accompanying music video for "Walking in My Shoes" was directed by Anton Corbijn. At the beginning of the second verse, there is a shot of Martin Gore, Andy Fletcher, and Alan Wilder with naked women on their laps. This was removed in the MTV version in the US and replaced with footage of the three members standing still, alone, from earlier in the video. The uncut version is on The Videos 86-98, Devotional, The Best Of, Volume 1 and Video Singles Collection DVDs.

Track listings
All songs were written by Martin Gore.

 CD: Mute / CD BONG 22 (UK)
 "Walking in My Shoes" (seven inch mix) – 4:59
 "Walking in My Shoes" (Grungy Gonads mix) – 6:24
 "My Joy" (seven inch mix) – 3:57
 "My Joy" (Slow Slide mix) – 5:11

 Limited-edition CD and 12-inch: Mute / LCD BONG 22, L12 BONG 22 (UK)
 "Walking in My Shoes" (extended twelve inch mix) – 6:54
 "Walking in My Shoes" (Random Carpet mix) – 6:35
 "Walking in My Shoes" (Anandamidic mix) – 6:11
 "Walking in My Shoes" (Ambient Whale mix) – 4:54

 12-inch: Mute / 12 BONG 22 (UK)
A1. "Walking in My Shoes" (Grungy Gonads mix) – 6:24
A2. "Walking in My Shoes" (seven inch mix) – 4:59
B1. "My Joy" (seven inch mix) – 3:57
B2. "My Joy" (Slow Slide mix) – 5:11

 Cassette: Mute / C BONG 22 (UK)
 "Walking in My Shoes" – 4:59
 "My Joy" – 3:57

 12-inch and maxi-cassette: Sire, Reprise / 9 40852-0, 9 40852-4 (US)
A1. "Walking in My Shoes" (extended twelve inch mix) – 6:53
A2. "Walking in My Shoes" (Random Carpet mix edit) – 6:10
A3. "Walking in My Shoes" (Grungy Gonads mix) – 6:24
B1. "Walking in My Shoes" (Anandamidic mix) – 6:11
B2. "Walking in My Shoes" (Ambient Whale mix) – 4:54
B3. "My Joy" (Slow Slide mix) – 5:12

 Maxi-CD: Sire, Reprise / 9 40852-2 (US)
 "Walking in My Shoes" (seven inch mix) – 4:59
 "Walking in My Shoes" (Grungy Gonads mix) – 6:24
 "Walking in My Shoes" (Random Carpet mix) – 6:10
 "My Joy" (Slow Slide mix) – 5:12
 "Walking in My Shoes" (extended twelve inch mix) – 6:53
 "Walking in My Shoes" (Anandamidic mix) – 6:11
 "My Joy" – 3:58
 "Walking in My Shoes" (Ambient Whale mix) – 4:54

Charts

Weekly charts

Year-end charts

See also
 Number one modern rock hits of 1993

References

External links
 Single information from the official Depeche Mode web site
 Allmusic review 

1993 singles
1993 songs
Depeche Mode songs
Music videos directed by Anton Corbijn
Mute Records singles
Reprise Records singles
Sire Records singles
Song recordings produced by Flood (producer)
Songs written by Martin Gore